William George Sloan (September 27, 1886 – June 3, 1931) was an American Negro league outfielder and pitcher in the 1900s.

Sloan was a native of Dayton, Ohio.

Negro league career 
In 1908, Sloan was on the pitching staff of the semi-pro Cleveland Giants. In 1909, Sloan played for at least 4 teams: the Cuban Stars of Havana, Illinois Giants, Kansas City Giants, and Leland Giants in 1909. In five recorded games, he posted six hits in 20 plate appearances.

Dayton Marcos 
In 1910, Sloan returned to his hometown and served as team captain of the Dayton Marcos.In 1912, Sloan and owner/manager John Matthews had a brief dispute and he was briefly benched, returning in August and remaining on the pitching staff through 1914.

Dayton flood of 1913 
During the Great Dayton Flood of 1913, Sloan, also an employee at the Kuhns Brothers Foundry in the offseason, walked to the nearby Dayton D Handle Company and asked for permission to use their small boat to rescue residents trapped in the flood waters. When the owner refused, Sloan produced a handgun and commandeered the boat with two other men.Over 3 days, Sloan rescued at least 317 people including his own 1 year old son Jamesand Leroy Crandall, the owner of the boat.For his efforts, Sloan was recommended for the Carnegie Medal.

Injury and retirement 
In 1914, Sloan was injured in a work accident when he was stuck under an elevator on a construction site. He was hospitalized with a bruised stomach and hips.Sloan never returned to the Marcos.

Death and legacy 
Sloan died in Dayton, Ohio in 1931 at age 44 and buried in an unmarked grave at Woodland Cemetery in Dayton.In 1997, he was depicted in the play "1913-The Great Dayton Flood" at Wright State University. The play was revived in 2013.A historic marker detailing Sloan's role in the 1913 flood was erected on the banks of the Great Miami River in Dayton. In 2013, an anonymous Good Samaritan donated and placed a headstone on Sloan's grave.

References

External links
Baseball statistics and player information from Baseball-Reference Black Baseball Stats and Seamheads

1886 births
1931 deaths
Illinois Giants players
Kansas City Giants players
Leland Giants players

Cuban Stars (West) players
Dayton Marcos players